Peruvalanallur is a small village in the district of Trichy in the Indian state of Tamil Nadu. It is located in Lalgudi taluk. The nearest large village is Poovalur. Both side have two lakes, northside of village have two river passing, south part have rice or sugarcane cultivation.

Economy

The major occupation in the village is agriculture, mainly sugarcane and rice. The land is fertile throughout the year.

History 

The village may have originated in the 15th or 17th century, although the exact date is unknown. The Chalukya emperors, who ruled this region of India, called for war against the Pallavas. The Chalukyas attained victory.

The Salukyas then decided to wage war against the Cholazs Empire, which administered the village and surrounding areas. At this time, the Cholazs Empire extended from Indonesia to Sri Lanka and its rulers were reluctant to conduct war in northern India. The Cholazs had well-trained soldiers and more than 5,000 war elephants. Nevertheless, the Chalukyas defeated them, even though they lacked an equal elephant army. 

The Pallavas then decided to wage war on the Salukyas to reclaim their autonomy. The Pallavas, expecting the Chalukya army, camped in "Palla puram" (the namesake of Palla puram). The Chalukyas encamped in Vellanur village. The armies clashed in Peruvalanallur, along the Pullambadi Canal. The fighting lasted 14 to 18 days and is one of the longest wars in Tamil Nadu history, with many soldiers killed on both sides. Finally, the Palla secured the victory and recovered their autonomy.

Some stone culvert remnants date from this period, located in a cremation ground along Vellanur road near Teppakulam and the Trichy-Ariyalur main road in Peruvala Nallur. A sword that may be a remnant of the war has been discovered by a pallar  community village farmer in his field.

Emigration 
In the last 8–10 years, residents have been moving out of the village to Trichy, a large city with better job opportunities in non-agricultural industries. Because of this, the village's population is quite low, and agricultural production has fallen.

Villages in Tiruchirappalli district